Hoshihananomia trichopalpis is a species of beetle in the genus Hoshihananomia of the family Mordellidae, which is part of the superfamily Tenebrionoidea. It was discovered in 1975.

References

Beetles described in 1975
Mordellidae